AHX may refer to:

 .AHX, a module file format originating on Amiga computers
 Amakusa Airlines (ICAO:AHX), a Japanese airline
 American History X, a 1998 film
 Aminohexanoic acid (Ahx), also known as Aminocaproic acid
 Renault AHx, a range of light/medium trucks
 , in Middlesex, England
 A file format sister to ADX